Rosi Eichenlaub (born 16 July 1958) is a German former footballer who played as a forward. She made twelve appearances for the Germany national team from 1983 to 1985.

References

External links
 

1958 births
Living people
German women's footballers
Women's association football forwards
Germany women's international footballers
Place of birth missing (living people)